Ruth Weyher (28 May 1901 – 27 January 1983) was a German film actress of the silent era. She appeared in 60 films between 1920 and 1930. She starred in the 1926 film Secrets of a Soul, which was directed by Georg Wilhelm Pabst.

Selected filmography

 A Dying Nation (1922)
 Warning Shadows (1923)
 Adam and Eve (1923)
 The Ancient Law (1923)
 The Fake Emir (1924)
 A Dangerous Game (1924)
 Comedy of the Heart (1924)
 Darling of the King (1924)
 Wood Love (1925)
 The Fire Dancer (1925)
 Reveille: The Great Awakening (1925)
 Chaste Susanne (1926)
 Secrets of a Soul (1926)
 The Flames Lie (1926)
 The Trumpets are Blowing (1926)
 Lives in Danger (1926)
 Marriage Announcement (1926)
 The Woman in the Cupboard (1927)
 The Impostor (1927)
 Klettermaxe (1927)
 Parisiennes (1928)
 Milak, the Greenland Hunter (1928)
 Father and Son (1929)
 What's Wrong with Nanette? (1929)
 Bobby, the Petrol Boy (1929)

References

External links

1901 births
1983 deaths
German film actresses
German silent film actresses
20th-century German actresses